Grey or gray box may refer to:

Science and technology
 Gray box testing, software testing
 Grey box model, in  mathematics, statistics, and computational modelling
 Grey identification method, used in system identification

Botany
 Jojoba (Simmondsia chinensis), also known as gray box bush

Eucalyptus
 Grey box, many trees in the genus Eucalyptus, native to Australia, including:
Eucalyptus argillacea (Kimberley grey box or northern grey box) 
Eucalyptus bosistoana (coast grey box or Gippsland grey box)  
Eucalyptus brownii (grey box) 
Eucalyptus hemiphloia (grey box); See Eucalyptus albens
Eucalyptus largeana (grey box) 
Eucalyptus microcarpa (grey box, inland grey box or western grey box) 
Eucalyptus moluccana (grey box or coastal grey box)  
Eucalyptus normantonensis (grey box) 
Eucalyptus pilligaensis (narrow-leaved grey box, pilliga grey box) 
Eucalyptus quadrangulata (grey box)
Eucalyptus rummeryi (grey box)
Eucalyptus tectifica (grey box)